Gambia Film Unit was an agency of the Gambian government that produced short films and showed them in remote parts of The Gambia. It was founded in 1967 and led by Ebrima Sagnia from 1972. It was merged into Gam TV, a predecessor to the Gambia Radio & Television Service (GRTS), in 1995.

History 
The Gambia Film Unit was founded in 1967 as a cinema projection unit in the Department of Agriculture. Oxfam donated a camera and projection equipment, and the department acquired a Land Rover with a built-in power generator. The unit produced short films on various topics that it then showed to people in villages. One film, 'Two Years of Progress', highlighted the government's achievements in the two years following independence. In 1969, the unit was transferred to the control of the Department of Information. Following this transfer, it began producing films on topics such as health, nutrition, the 1973 census, and the 1978 state visit of the President of Nigeria.

In 1969, Ebrima Sagnia was sent on a production course at the London Film School, returning in 1972 to head the unit. The unit acted in the place of a television service in remote parts of The Gambia. Early production was hampered by a lack of laboratory facilities and editing equipment, and the lack of trained Gambians in this field. Due to these conditions, the government requested assistance from the UN Development Programme for the expansion of the unit. An expert from the UNDP began working with the unit in July 1972. In 1975, a black and white film laboratory and the training of technicians were also provided for. In 1981, the unit was able to capture footage of the coup d'etat attempt that was used by news media across the world.

The unit held an important role in Gambian media, alongside Radio Gambia and the Gambia News Bulletin. The unit became part of Gam TV, The Gambia's first TV station, which was short-lived before it became itself part of Gambia Radio & Television Service (GRTS) in 1995. Sagnia and others involved in the unit have since been described as "pioneers" of Gambian film by Gambian filmmaker Prince Bubacarr Aminata Sankanu.

References 

History of television
History of film
Television in the Gambia
Communications in the Gambia
1967 establishments in the Gambia
Television channels and stations established in 1967
State media